Ralph Shigeto Iwamoto (1927–2013) was an American abstract painter born in Honolulu, Hawaii.  From 1945 to 1952, he served in the Saitama Prefecture of occupied Japan with the 441st Counter Intelligence Corps of the United States Army.  After military service, he settled in New York City.

Aurora, from 1957, demonstrates the artist's use of muted colors and organic forms.  The Butler Institute of American Art (Youngstown, Ohio), the Herbert F. Johnson Museum of Art (Cornell University, Ithaca, NY), the Honolulu Museum of Art,  the New Mexico Museum of Art (Santa Fe), and the Weatherspoon Art Museum (Greensboro, North Carolina) are among the public collections holding work by Ralph Iwamoto.

References
 Iwamoto, Ralph, Ralph Iwamoto: Work from the 50s, David Findlay, Jr., 2004, ASIN: B002EM5EY4

Footnotes

1927 births
2013 deaths
20th-century American painters
American male painters
American artists of Japanese descent
American military personnel of Japanese descent
People from Oahu
Painters from Hawaii
20th-century American male artists